The 1989 Dunhill Cup was the fifth Dunhill Cup. It was a team golf tournament featuring 16 countries, each represented by three players. The Cup was played 28 September – 1 October at the Old Course at St Andrews in Scotland. The sponsor was the Alfred Dunhill company. The American team of Mark Calcavecchia, Tom Kite, and Curtis Strange beat the Japanese team of Hajime Meshiai, Naomichi Ozaki, and Koichi Suzuki in the final. It was the first time that the number one seeded team won the Cup.

Format
The Cup was played as a single-elimination, match play event played over four days. The top eight teams were seeded with the remaining teams randomly placed in the bracket. In each match, the three players were paired with their opponents and played 18 holes at medal match play. Tied matches were extended to a sudden-death playoff only if they affected the outcome between the two teams. In the first format change of the Cup, the final was played as two sets of three 18-hole matches, instead of one set.

Bracket

Round by round scores

First round
Source:

Quarter-finals
Source:

Semi-finals
Source:

Final
Source:

Third place
Source:

Team results

Player results

References

Alfred Dunhill Cup
Dunhill Cup
Dunhill Cup
Dunhill Cup
Dunhill Cup